Le blog de Frantico is a supposedly autobiographical Franco-Belgian webcomic that ran in 2005. It is drawn by Frantico, thought to be a pen name of Lewis Trondheim. In his blog, Frantico describes the miseries of his sex life. Le blog de Frantico was compiled into a comic book published by Albin Michel in October 2005, and it was nominated for the 2006 Prize for First Comic Book at the Angoulême International Comics Festival

Content
In Le blog de Frantico, the anonymous author describes the miseries of his daily life, with a specific focus on his sexual life.

Author
It is widely speculated that the author of Frantico is Lewis Trondheim, and though he initially denied it, he later admitted that he indeed created the blog. The auto-biographical nature of the Frantico webcomic has been confirmed to be false. A first comic book compilation of Le blog de Frantico was published by Albin Michel in October 2005

References

External links
Le blog de Frantico
Frantico web forum

Webcomics in print
Comics publications
French bloggers
2005 webcomic debuts
French webcomics
Autobiographical webcomics